The Natural Way of Things (2015) is a novel by Australian writer Charlotte Wood.  It won the Stella Prize, for writing by Australian women, in 2016.

Plot summary
Ten young women are held prisoner somewhere in the Australian bush by two male guards and a woman who purports to be a nurse.  The women come to discover that they are all connected in that they are all the victims of sexual scandals.  They have been kidnapped and kept out of society's view in order for the scandal to die down.  But they are also humiliated, and physically and emotionally punished.

Critical reception
Rosemary Sorenson in The Sydney Review of Books, is in no doubt about the novel's worth: "Charlotte Wood’s fifth novel The Natural Way of Things is a virtuoso performance, plotted deftly through a minefield of potential traps, weighted with allegory yet swift and sure in its narrative advance. As an idea for a novel, it’s rich, and to achieve that idea the writer has been courageous. Her control of this story is masterful."

Kerryn Goldsworthy in The Sydney Morning Herald agrees: "This is an extraordinary novel: inspired, powerful, at once coherent and dreamlike. While it's rich in symbols and in implications, much of it is brutally realist in mode, with its flights of imagination anchored in rational explanations: the result of drugs or fever dreams...The Natural Way of Things recalls all the reading you've ever done on the subjects of capture, isolation, incarceration, totalitarianism, misogyny, and the abuse of power. It's thought-provoking in all directions."

Awards
 2016 – winner Stella Prize
 2016 – shortlisted Victorian Premier's Literary Awards — The Vance Palmer Prize for Fiction
 2016 – winner Indie Awards — Fiction
 2016 – longlisted Australian Book Industry Awards (ABIA) — Australian Literary Fiction Book of the Year
 2016 – shortlisted Miles Franklin Literary Award
 2016 – longlisted Kibble Literary Awards — Nita Kibble Literary Award

See also
 2015 in literature

References

2015 Australian novels
Allen & Unwin books